The Subaru FF-1 G (also sold as the 1100 and 1300) was a compact car from the 1970s, replacing the FF-1 Star.  It was a front-wheel drive vehicle with a typical Subaru EA61 or EA62 flat-4 engine.  The car also had independent torsion bar suspension and rack and pinion steering, inboard front drum brakes and dual radiators. The car used only a small radiator (which was also the heater core) on starting, hastening warm up. Achieving , the Subaru quickly became a strong-selling import car in the United States.

Engines
The 1.1L EA61 and 1.3L EA62 engines had no cooling fan, only an electric fan on the small radiator cooled the engine.  The 1.1L was shared with the Subaru FF-1 Star, however the 1.3L engine was unique to this model and the only Subaru engine to have rear-facing exhaust ports.  Most 1972–73 models were equipped with the 1.3L EA62 engine and dual carburetors was an available factory option.  The transmission was also borrowed from the Subaru FF-1 Star.

EA61 1.1L OHV water-cooled flat-4
Displacement: 76 mm x 60 mm, 1088 cc
Power:  at 5600 rpm,  at 4000 rpm with 9:1 compression and two-barrel carburetor

EA62 1.3L OHV water-cooled flat-4
Displacement: 82 mm x 60 mm, 1268 cc
Power:  at 6400 rpm,  at 4000 rpm with 9:1 compression and dual two-barrel carburetors

Transmission
Subaru T71 four-speed manual, front-wheel drive
Gear Ratios: 1st 3.540 2nd 2.235 3rd 1.543 4th 1.033, Rev 4.100 Final 4.125

References

 1972 Subaru Sales Brochure

All-wheel-drive vehicles
Station wagons
G
Cars powered by boxer engines
Cars introduced in 1971